Carly McNaul (born 22 June 1989) is a boxer from Belfast.

McNaul trains at the Ormeau Road Boxing Club.

At flyweight, she won silver at the 2018 Commonwealth Games.

Personal life
McNaul has one child, a son, and describes Mike Tyson and Vasyl Lomachenko as her heroes.

References

External links

Living people
1989 births
Women boxers from Northern Ireland
Commonwealth Games medallists in boxing
Commonwealth Games silver medallists for Northern Ireland
Boxers from Belfast
Boxers at the 2018 Commonwealth Games
Boxers at the 2022 Commonwealth Games
Flyweight boxers
Medallists at the 2018 Commonwealth Games
Medallists at the 2022 Commonwealth Games